This is a list of computing schools in Pakistan, recognized by the National Computing Education Accreditation Council (NCEAC) - Higher Education Commission (Pakistan) (HEC).

 SE – software engineering
 CS – computer science
 IS – information system
 IT – information technology
 CE – computer engineering
 CISE – computer and information systems engineering
 Bio-informatics

Azad Kashmir

Mirpur
 Mirpur University of Science and Technology (MUST) - BS-SE

Muzaffarabad
 University of Azad Jammu and Kashmir - BS-CS, BS-SE

Rawalakot
 University of Poonch - BS-CS

Balochistan

Quetta

 Balochistan University of Information Technology, Engineering and Management Sciences - BS-CS, BS-IT
 Al-Hamd Islamic University BS-CS, BS-IT

Capital Territory

Islamabad
 Air University (Pakistan Air Force) - BS-CS
 Bahria University - BS-CS
 Center for Advanced Studies in Engineering (CASE) - BS-CS
 COMSATS Institute of Information Technology - BS-CS
 Federal Urdu University - BS-CS
 Foundation University, Islamabad - BS-SE
 International Islamic University, Islamabad - BS-CS, BS-SE
 Institute of Space Technology  -BS-CS
 Iqra University - BS-CS
 Capital University of Science & Technology - BS-CS, BS-SE
 National University of Computer and Emerging Sciences (FAST) - BS-CS
 National University of Modern Languages (NUML) - BS-CS, BS-SE
 Quaid-i-Azam University Islamabad - BS-CS, BS-IT
 Pakistan Institute of Engineering and Applied Sciences (PIEAS) - BS-IS
 Preston University (Pakistan) - BS-CS
 Riphah International University - BS-SE
 National University of Sciences and Technology (NUST) -BS-CS

Khyber Pakhtunkhwa

Abbottabad
 COMSATS Institute of Information Technology - BS-CS, BS-SE, BS-TN

Bannu
 University of Science and Technology (Bannu) - BS-CS, BS-SE

Dera Ismail Khan
 Gomal University - BS-CS
 Qurtuba University - BS-CS

Haripur
 University of Haripur - BS-CS

Mardan

 Eurisko Institute of Science & Information Technology Mardan

Peshawar
 Abasyn University - BS-CS, BS-SE
 City University of Science and Information Technology, Peshawar - BS-CS, BS-SE
 National University of Computer and Emerging Sciences (FAST) - BS-CS
 Sarhad University of Science and Information Technology - BS-CS
 Shaheed Benazir Bhutto Women University - BS-Bioinformatics
 University of Peshawar - BS-CS
 Iqra National University, Peshawar - BS-CS, BS-SE

Swabi

 Ghulam Ishaq Khan Institute of Engineering Sciences and Technology - BS-CS
 University of Swabi - BS-BBA-MBA

Punjab

Attock
 COMSATS Institute of Information Technology - BS-CS

Bahawalpur
 Islamia University, Bahawalpur - BS-CS, BS-IT, BS-SE

Faisalabad
 Government College University, Faisalabad - BS-CS, BS-IT, BS-SE
 National Textile University - BS-CS
 National University of Computer and Emerging Sciences-FAST-BS-CS

Gujranwala
 GIFT University - BS-CS

Gujrat
 University of Gujrat - BS-CS, BS-IT, BS-SE, M.Sc-IT, M.Sc-CS, M.Phil-IT, M.Phil-CS, PhD
 University of Lahore, Gujrat Campus - BS-CS, BS-IT, M.Sc-IT, M.Sc-CS, M.Phil-IT, M.Phil-CS

Lahore

 Lahore Garrison University, DHA Phase VI, Sector C, Avenue 4th Main Campus - BS-DF, BS-IT, BS-SE, BS-CS, MS-CS, MCS
 Bahria University, Lahore Campus - BS-IT, BS-CS
 Superior University, Lahore - BS-CS, BS-IT, BS-SE, BS-CE
 Beaconhouse National University - BS-SE
 University of South-Asia, Lahore - BS-IT, BS-CS, BS-IT, BS-SE
 COMSATS Institute of Information Technology, Lahore Campus - BS-CS
 Government College University, Lahore - BS-CS
 Lahore College for Women University - BS-CS
 National University of Computer and Emerging Sciences (FAST) - BS-CS
 Punjab University College of Information Technology (PUCIT) - BS-CS, BS-IT, BS-SE
 University of Central Punjab - BS-CS
 University of Education - BS-IT
 University of Sargodha, Lahore Campus - BS-IT
 University of Lahore - BS-CS
 University of Engineering and Technology, Lahore - BS-CS
 University of Management and Technology, Lahore - BS-CS, BS-SE
 Forman Christian College - BS-IT, BS-CS, BS-IT, BS-SE

Mianwali 
 Namal College - BS-CS

Multan 
 Bahauddin Zakariya University - BS-CS, BS-IT
 University of Education - BS-IT
 Air University - BS-CS
 Institute of Southern Punjab - BS-CS, BS-IT
 NFC Institute of Engineering and Technology-BS-CS,BS-IT,Software engineering

Rawalpindi 
 Army Public College of Management Sciences (APCOMS) - BS-SE
 COMSATS Institute of Information Technology (Wah Cantonment Campus) - BS-CS
 National University of Sciences and Technology (Pakistan) (NUST) - BS-IT
 HITEC University, Taxila (HITEC) - BS-CS, BS-CE
 Pir Mehr Ali Shah Arid Agriculture University - BS-CS
 University of Engineering and Technology, Taxila - BS-SE
 University of Wah - BS-CS
MASIA Institute 
 Galaxy Institute of Technology and Languages -

Sahiwal
 COMSATS Institute of Information Technology - BS-CS

Sargodha
 University of Sargodha - BS-CS, BS-IT, BS-SE

Sindh

Hyderabad
 Isra University - BS-CS, BS-SE
 SZABIST - BS-CS 
 HIAST Affiliated with Mehran University of Engineering & Technology - BS-IT, MS-BIT

Tandojam
 Sindh Agriculture University - BS-IT, MS-IT, MS-SE

Jamshoro
 University of Sindh - BS-CS, BS-SE, BS-IT, M.Phil - CS, M.Phil - SE, M.Phil - IT
 Mehran University of Engineering & Technology - BE-SE, BE-CS, ME-SE, ME-CIE, ME-IT

Karachi
 Aligarh Institute of Technology - BS-CS
 Bahria University - BS-CS, BS-IT
 DHA Suffa University - BS-CS
 Habib University - BS-CS
 Hamdard University - BS-CS
 Indus University - BS-CS, BS-SE, BS-IT
 Institute of Business Administration, Karachi - BS-CS
 Institute of Business & Technology, Karachi (BizTek) - BS-CS, BS-SE, BS-IT
 Institute of Business Management - BS-CS
 Iqra University - BS-CS
 Jinnah University for Women - BS-CS, BS-SE, BS-IT
 Karachi Institute of Economics and Technology - BS-CS
 Muhammad Ali Jinnah University (MAJU) - BS-CS
 National University of Computer and Emerging Sciences (FAST) - BS-CS
 NED University of Engineering and Technology - BE-CISE, BS-CSIT, BE-SE
 Pakistan Navy Engineering College - BS-IS
 Shaheed Zulfiqar Ali Bhutto Institute of Science and Technology (SZABIST) - BS-CS
 Sindh Madrasatul Islam University (SMI) - BS-CS
 Sir Syed University of Engineering and Technology (SSUET) - BS-CS, BS-CE
 University of Karachi (KU), UBIT - BS-CS, BS-SE
 Usman Institute of Technology - BS-CS

Sukkur
 Sukkur Institute of Business Administration - BS-CS, BS-SE

See also

 Education in Pakistan
 List of schools in Pakistan

References

External links
 List at www.nceac.org

Computing schools in Pakistan